Chlamydastis is a genus of moths in the subfamily Stenomatinae.

Species
Chlamydastis acronitis (Busck, 1911)
Chlamydastis anamochla (Meyrick, 1929)
Chlamydastis ancalota (Meyrick, 1916)
Chlamydastis apoclina Meyrick, 1929
Chlamydastis arenaria (Walsingham, 1913)
Chlamydastis argocymba (Meyrick, 1926)
Chlamydastis batrachopis (Meyrick, 1913)
Chlamydastis bifida (Meyrick, 1916)
Chlamydastis byssophanes (Meyrick, 1926)
Chlamydastis caecata (Meyrick, 1916)
Chlamydastis chionoptila (Meyrick, 1926)
Chlamydastis chionosphena (Meyrick, 1931)
Chlamydastis chlorosticta (Meyrick, 1913)
Chlamydastis complexa (Meyrick, 1916)
Chlamydastis crateroptila (Meyrick, 1918)
Chlamydastis curviliniella (Busck, 1914)
Chlamydastis cystiodes (Meyrick, 1916)
Chlamydastis deflexa (Meyrick, 1916)
Chlamydastis deflua (Meyrick, 1918)
Chlamydastis discors (Meyrick, 1913)
Chlamydastis disticha (Meyrick, 1916)
Chlamydastis dominicae Duckworth, 1969
Chlamydastis dryosphaera (Meyrick, 1926)
Chlamydastis elaeostola (Meyrick, 1930)
Chlamydastis epophrysta (Meyrick, 1909)
Chlamydastis forcipata (Meyrick, 1913)
Chlamydastis fragmentella (Dognin, 1914)
Chlamydastis funicularis (Meyrick, 1926)
Chlamydastis galeomorpha (Meyrick, 1931)
Chlamydastis gemina (Zeller, 1855)
Chlamydastis habrolepis Blanchard & Knudson, 1986
Chlamydastis hemichlora (Meyrick, 1916)
Chlamydastis ichthyodes (Meyrick, 1926)
Chlamydastis illita (Meyrick, 1926)
Chlamydastis inscitum (Busck, 1911)
Chlamydastis inspectrix (Meyrick, 1916)
Chlamydastis lactis (Busck, 1911)
Chlamydastis leptobelisca (Meyrick, 1929)
Chlamydastis leucoplasta (Meyrick, 1926)
Chlamydastis leucoptila (Meyrick, 1918)
Chlamydastis lichenias (Meyrick, 1916)
Chlamydastis lithograpta (Meyrick, 1913)
Chlamydastis melanometra (Meyrick, 1926)
Chlamydastis melanonca (Meyrick, 1915)
Chlamydastis mendoron (Busck, 1911)
Chlamydastis metacymba (Meyrick, 1916)
Chlamydastis metacystis (Meyrick, 1918)
Chlamydastis metamochla (Meyrick, 1931)
Chlamydastis mochlopa (Meyrick, 1915)
Chlamydastis molinella (Stoll, [1781])
Chlamydastis monastra (Meyrick, 1909)
Chlamydastis morbida (Zeller, 1877)
Chlamydastis mysticopis (Meyrick, 1926)
Chlamydastis nestes (Busck, 1911)
Chlamydastis obnupta (Meyrick, 1916)
Chlamydastis ommatopa (Meyrick, 1926)
Chlamydastis ophiopa (Meyrick, 1916)
Chlamydastis orion (Busck, 1920)
Chlamydastis oxyplaga (Meyrick, 1929)
Chlamydastis paradromis (Meyrick, 1915)
Chlamydastis perducta (Meyrick, 1916)
Chlamydastis phasmatopa (Meyrick, 1910)
Chlamydastis phytoptera (Busck, 1914)
Chlamydastis platyspora (Meyrick, 1932)
Chlamydastis plocogramma (Meyrick, 1915)
Chlamydastis poliopa (Meyrick, 1916)
Chlamydastis praenubila (Meyrick, 1926)
Chlamydastis prudentula (Meyrick, 1926)
Chlamydastis ptilopa (Meyrick, 1913)
Chlamydastis rhomaeopa (Meyrick, 1931)
Chlamydastis scutellata (Meyrick, 1916)
Chlamydastis smodicopa (Meyrick, 1915)
Chlamydastis spectrophthalma (Meyrick, 1932)
Chlamydastis squamosa (Walsingham, [1892])
Chlamydastis stagnicolor (Meyrick, 1926)
Chlamydastis steloglypta (Meyrick, 1931)
Chlamydastis strabonia (Meyrick, 1930)
Chlamydastis synedra (Meyrick, 1916)
Chlamydastis trastices (Busck, 1911)
Chlamydastis tritypa (Meyrick, 1909)
Chlamydastis truncatula (Meyrick, 1913)
Chlamydastis tryphon (Busck, 1920)
Chlamydastis ungulifera (Meyrick, 1929)
Chlamydastis xylinaspis (Meyrick, 1915)

References

 
Stenomatinae
Moth genera
Taxa named by Edward Meyrick